The 2012 GEICO 400 was a NASCAR Sprint Cup Series stock car race held on September 16, 2012, at Chicagoland Speedway in Joliet, Illinois. Contested over 267 laps, it was the twenty-seventh in the 2012 NASCAR Sprint Cup Series, as well as the first race in the ten-race Chase for the Sprint Cup, which ends the season.

Report

Background

Chicagoland Speedway is one of ten intermediate tracks to hold NASCAR races; the others are Atlanta Motor Speedway, Kansas Speedway, Charlotte Motor Speedway, Darlington Raceway, Homestead Miami Speedway, New Hampshire Motor Speedway, Kentucky Speedway, Las Vegas Motor Speedway, and Texas Motor Speedway. The track's turns are each banked at 18 degrees and have a turn width of 55 feet. The racetrack has a grandstand capacity of 75,000.

Before the race, Denny Hamlin led the Drivers' Championship with 2,012 points, with Jimmie Johnson in second place with, 2,009. Tony Stewart and Brad Keselowski were tied with Johnson for the second position, while Greg Biffle had 2,006 points. Clint Bowyer also with 2,006 points was one point ahead of Dale Earnhardt Jr. and Matt Kenseth, as Kevin Harvick and Martin Truex Jr. rounded out the top ten with 2,000 points each. In the parallel Chase for the Sprint Cup, Kasey Kahne and Jeff Gordon both started with their points total reset to 2,000. In the Manufacturers' Championship, Chevrolet was leading with 179 points, twenty-four points ahead of Toyota. Ford, with 129 points, was twenty points ahead of Dodge in the battle for third place. Stewart was the race's defending winner.

Practice and qualifying

Two practice sessions were held in preparation for the race; both on Friday, September 14, 2012. The first session and second session lasted for 90 minutes each.  During the first practice session, Truex Jr., for the Michael Waltrip Racing team, was quickest ahead of Earnhardt Jr. in second and Keselowski in third. Trevor Bayne was scored fourth, and Hamlin managed fifth. Jamie McMurray, Mark Martin, Jeff Burton, Carl Edwards and Ryan Newman rounded out the top ten quickest drivers in the session.

Kyle Busch was quickest in the second and final practice session, ahead of Aric Almirola in second, and Martin in third. Edwards was fourth quickest, and Hamlin took fifth. Kahne, Johnson, Bayne, Kenseth, and Gordon followed in the top ten. Of the other drivers in the Chase for the Sprint Cup, Stewart was scored fourteenth fastest, while Truex Jr. was scored twenty-fifth.

Forty-seven cars were entered for qualifying, but only forty-three could race because of NASCAR's qualifying procedure. Johnson clinched his second pole position in the season, with a time of 29.530. He was joined on the front row of the grid by Almirola. Kenseth qualified third, Earnhardt Jr. took fourth, and Edwards started fifth. Biffle, one of the drivers in the Chase for the Sprint Cup, qualified twenty-second, while Harvick was scored thirty-fifth. The three drivers that failed to qualify for the race were Scott Riggs, Reed Sorenson, J. J. Yeley, and Jason Leffler.

Results

Race results

Standings after the race

Drivers' Championship standings

Manufacturers' Championship standings

Note: Only the first twelve positions are included for the driver standings.

References 

GEICO 400
NASCAR races at Chicagoland Speedway
GEICO 400
GEICO 400